Prisionera de amor (English title: Prisoner of love) is a Mexican telenovela produced by Pedro Damián for Televisa in 1994.

Maribel Guardia and Saúl Lisazo starred as protagonists, while Julieta Egurrola, Lorena Meritano, Rosario Gálvez, Gabriela Goldsmith, Sebastián Ligarde and Fernando Ciangherotti starred as antagonists.

Plot 
Cristina Carbajal is a woman who has paid an unjust sentence in jail. She was wrongly blamed for the death of her husband. After ten years, she gets out of prison for good behavior.

Her daughters, Karina and Rosita, who were five and one year old when Cristina was imprisoned, are now 15 and 11 years old. They have been brought up by their father's aunt and uncle, Eloísa and Braulio Monasterios.

The Monasterios hate Cristina. They believe that she is responsible for their nephew's death. The Monasterios have told the girls that they are orphans.

Cast 
 
Maribel Guardia as Cristina Carbajal/Florencia Rondán
Saúl Lisazo as José Armando Vidal
Gabriela Goldsmith as Isaura Durán
Rafael Baledón as Braulio Monasterios #1
Eduardo Noriega as Braulio Monastaerios #2
Julieta Egurrola as Flavia Monasterios
Alberto Inzúa as Gastón Monasterios
Irán Eory as Eloísa
Karla Álvarez as Karina Monasterios
Gerardo Hemmer as Alex Monasterios
Alix as Sonia Monasterios
Alisa Vélez as Rosita Monasterios
Ariel López Padilla as Federico Monasterios
Rosario Gálvez as Eugenia
Leticia Calderón as Consuelo
Eduardo Santamarina as Rodrigo Miranda
Carmen Amezcua as Gisela
Rodolfo Arias as Efrén
Álvaro Carcaño as Pascual
Juan Felipe Preciado as Albino
Lorena Meritano as Esther
Fernando Ciangherotti as Augusto Bianchi
Sebastián Ligarde as Gerardo Ávila
Juan Carlos Muñoz as Ángel
Roberto Gutiérrez as Oswaldo Serrano
Silvia Derbez as Chayo
Alpha Acosta as Mariana
Fabiola Campomanes as Lucila
Leonardo García as Óscar
Mané Macedo as Delia Escobedo
Patricia Martínez as Eufemia
Irma Torres as Librada
Georgina Pedret as Luz
Mónica Dionne as Teté
Sergio Jiménez as Dr. Santos
Javier Gómez as Humberto
Alma Rosa Añorve
Beatriz Ambriz
José Salomé Brito
Dionisio
Bárbara Eibenshutz
Maximiliano Hernández
Claudia Inchaurregui
Thelma Dorantes
José Amador
Kala Ruiz
Carlos Águila
Aracely Arámbula

Awards

References

External links

1994 telenovelas
Mexican telenovelas
1994 Mexican television series debuts
1994 Mexican television series endings
Television shows set in Mexico
Televisa telenovelas
Mexican television series based on Venezuelan television series
Spanish-language telenovelas